was a Japanese Olympic swimmer. He won silver medal for the Men's 1500 meter freestyle event in the 1932 Summer Olympics in Los Angeles, and a bronze medal for the Men’s 400 meter freestyle event in the 1936 Summer Olympics in Berlin.

Makino was born in Shizuoka Prefecture, Japan, and was a graduate of Waseda University. On August 30, 1931, while still a middle school student, he set a new world record for the Men’s 800-meter freestyle with a time of 10 minutes 16.6 seconds.

Competitive highlights
1932 Olympics 1500 m freestyle - 19:14.1
1936 Olympics 400 m freestyle - 4:48.1

See also
 List of members of the International Swimming Hall of Fame
World record progression 400 metres freestyle
World record progression 800 metres freestyle

External links
Japanese Olympic Committee database
Profile

1915 births
1987 deaths
Sportspeople from Shizuoka Prefecture
Waseda University alumni
Japanese male freestyle swimmers
Olympic swimmers of Japan
Olympic silver medalists for Japan
Olympic bronze medalists for Japan
Swimmers at the 1932 Summer Olympics
Swimmers at the 1936 Summer Olympics
World record setters in swimming
Olympic bronze medalists in swimming
Medalists at the 1936 Summer Olympics
Medalists at the 1932 Summer Olympics
Olympic silver medalists in swimming
20th-century Japanese people